Couleur Café Festival is an annual urban contemporary music festival taking place around the end of June or early July in the city of Brussels, Belgium, organised since 1990. Since its inception, the festival had been located at Tour & Taxis, but from its 2017 edition it has moved to the Heysel Plateau near the Atomium. The scope of the three-day festival lies on world music with as main styles funk, hiphop, reggae, dance, dub, soul, Latin, blues and rock divided over four stages. Internationally famous acts as well as less known talent or locally popular musicians are represented.

Apart from the music itself there is also a large art exposition, a market with young designers, dance workshops, cocktailbars and food stands from a worldwide variety of kitchens (fifty countries). Festival visitors can camp nearby at Camping Zen.

In 2014, the entire event counted 72,000 visitors over three days.

Featured performers
Performers at previous festivals included:

 1990: Angélique Kidjo, Irakere, Mamady Keita, Papa Wemba, Zap Mama
 1991: Mory Kanté
 1992: Angélique Kidjo, Papa Wemba, The Wailers
 1995: Koffi Olomide, Terence Trent D'Arby
 1996: Galliano, Habib Koité, Noa, The Believers
 1997: Asian Dub Foundation, Maceo Parker, Youssou N’Dour, Ziggy Marley
 1998: Ciocarlia, Daniela Mercury, Famoudou Konaté, Jimmy Cliff, Khadja Nin, Mamady Keita, Mory Kanté, Natacha Atlas, Starflam
 1999: Cheb Mami, Faudel, Femi Kuti, Krewcial, P18, Zap Mama
 2000: Alpha Blondy, Amadou & Mariam, Asian Dub Foundation, Candy Dulfer, Orishas, Postmen, The Herbaliser, The Skatalites, The Wailers, Youssou N'Dour
 2001: Baaba Maal, Burning Spear, Carlinhos Brown, Culture, Khaled, Ozomatli, Starflam, Zuco 103
 2002: Cesaria Evora, Daniela Mercury, Horace Andy, Mory Kanté, Orishas, P18, Sizzla, Wawadadakwa, Zuco 103
 2003: Amparanoia, Asian Dub Foundation, I Muvrini, Israel Vibration, Jimmy Cliff, Kana, Mad Professor, Ojos De Brujo
 2004: Amparanoia, Ska-P, Souad Massi, Babylon Circus, Amp Fiddler, Gabriel Ríos, Starflam
 2005: Alpha Blondy, Arno, Femi Kuti, Jah Shaka, Jane Birkin, Kool Shen, Maceo Parker, Magnus, Mahala Raï Banda, Orishas, Rokia Traoré, Youssou N'Dour, Zap Mama, Zita Swoon
 2006: Amparanoia, Burning Spear, Cali, Gabriel Ríos, George Clinton, Gilberto Gil, Ivete Sangalo, James Brown, Louise Attaque, Off The Record, Patrick Watson, Saïan Supa Crew, Think Of One, Third World, Toumani Diabaté, Tracy Chapman, Vive la Fête, Fab Faya
 2007: Buscemi, Cassius, Daan, Dj Mehdi, Gotan Project, Kelis, Puggy, Sean Paul, The Roots, The Tellers, Ziggy Marley, Johnny Clegg
 2008: Aṣa, Erykah Badu, Gentleman, Jimmy Cliff, Kassav', Kery James, Natacha Atlas, Orishas, Zucchero
 2009: Amadou & Mariam, Alpha Blondy, Arno, Asian Dub Foundation, Babylon Circus, Ben Harper, Benabar, Cesaria Evora, Emir Kusturica, Khaled, Keziah Jones, Magic System, Mamady Keita, Oi Va Voi, Ozomatli, Rohff, Selah Sue, Shameboy, Solomon Burke, The Skatalites, Zap Mama
 2010: 1060, Diam's, Ebony Bones, Femi Kuti, George Clinton, Hindi Zahra, Papa Wemba, Rox, Scylla, Selah Sue, Snoop Dogg, Soprano, Staff Benda Bilili
 2011: Absynthe Minded, Alborosie, Arsenal, DJ Shadow, Merdan Taplak, Seal, Selah Sue, Yael Naim, Ziggy Marley, Ziggi Recado
 2012: Jessie J, Erykah Badu, Tinariwen, Sean Paul, De La Soul, Gentleman, Kaer, Stephen Marley, Public Enemy, Gogol Bordello
 2013: Neneh Cherry, Aloe Blacc, Maceo Parker, Andy Allo, Faithless, Jimmy Cliff, Matisyahu, Fat Freddy's Drop, Mos Def, Salif Keita, Kery James, Joeystarr
 2014: (planned): Basement Jaxx, Bootsy Collins and the Funk Unity Band, Dizzee Rascal, Parov Stelar Band, Tiken Jah Fakoly, De Jeugd van Tegenwoordig, Dilated Peoples, Girls in Hawaii, Puggy, Morcheeba, Soldout, Seeed, Seun Kuti, La Yegros, Skip & Die, Iron Ites, Captain Steel, Root Pursuit, The Rudies, Burning Spear, Tricky, Ben Howard, Chinese Man, The Subs, Keziah Jones, Chance The Rapper, Laura Mvula, Akua Naru, Cuban Beats All Stars, Veence Hanao, Oyster Node, Selectah Nesta, What It Is, Asian Dub Foundation, Alpha Blondy, Jurassic 5, Blitz The Ambassador, Magnus LIVE, Gabriel Rios, John Butler Trio, Ky-Mani Marley, Youssoupha, Protoje & The Indiggnation, Danakil, The Soul Rebels, Suarez, Little Collin
2015: 1995, Alborosie, Arsenal, Bigflo & Oli, Branko, Buraka Som Sistema, Busta Rhymes, Caravan Palace, Collie Buddz, Crystal Fighters, Cypress Hill, Dub Inc, Ester Rada, Flavia Coelho, G-Eazy, Gentleman, Groundation, Hiatus Kaiyote, Israel Vibration, Jah9, Joey Bada$$, Jupiter & Okwess International, Kasai Allstars, Kavinsky, La Chiva Gantiva, La Fine Equipe, Lefto, Midnite, Milky Chance, Modestep, Naâman, Oddisee, Palenke Soultribe, Pink Oculus, Sergent Garcia, Shantel, SOJA, Starflam, Superdiscount, Tarrus Riley, The Magician, Wu-Tang Clan, Wyclef Jean, Xavier Rudd
2016: Akua Naru, Alpha Wann, Apollo Brown, Arno, Atomic Spliff, Black Box Revelation, Bomba Estereo, Brigitte, Bunny Wailer, CHIC ft. Nile Rodgers, Chicos y Mendez, Chronixx, Clap! Clap!, Claptone, Cunninlynguists, De Jeugd van Tegenwoordig, De La Soul, Elito Reve & Su Charangon, Féfé, G.A.N, Ghinzu, Goran Bregovic, GRANDGEORGE, Hudson Mohawke, Ibeyi, Inna Modja, Jamie Woon, Jeremy Loops, Julian Marley, Kano, Kassav, Kel Assouf, Kwabs, LTGL, Magic System, Method Man & Redman, MHD, Morgan Heritage, Mr. Vegas, Nneka Omar Souleyman, Oxmo Puccino, Pat Thomas & Kwashibu Area Band, Pomrad, Protoje, Quantic, Raging Fyah, Roméo Elvis & Le Motel, Selah Sue, Soprano, St Paul and the Broken Bones, Trixie Whitley, Woodie Smalls, Young Fathers, Youssou N'Dour

2017

2018

2019

References

External links

Music festivals in Belgium
Recurring events established in 1990
1990 establishments in Belgium
Hip hop music festivals
Summer events in Belgium